Samuel Mumford Taylor (25 August 1859- 30 November 1929) was the second Bishop of Kingston.

Taylor was educated at University College London and ordained in 1885. After a curacy at St John the Evangelist's Leeds he became the first vicar of St Aidan's (Bishop Woodford Memorial) Leeds; He was then a canon residentiary and the precentor at Southwark Cathedral, then Archdeacon of Southwark. His penultimate post, until his resignation in 1921, was as a suffragan bishop. Finally he was appointed to lead the worship for St George's Chapel at Windsor Castle.

References

1859 births
Alumni of University College London
Archdeacons of Southwark
Bishops of Kingston
20th-century Church of England bishops
1929 deaths
Canons of Windsor